Alluri Seetarama Raju is a 1974 Indian Telugu-language biographical action film directed by V. Ramachandra Rao and written by Tripuraneni Maharadhi. The film stars Krishna, Vijaya Nirmala, and Jaggayya. It is produced by Padmalaya Studios marking the 100th film of Krishna. The film depicts the life of Alluri Sitarama Raju, an Indian revolutionary, who is known for his role in the Rampa Rebellion of 1922–24. Seetarama Raju, with a band of farmers, tribal leaders and other sympathizers, fought an armed rebellion against the British Raj in response to repressive legislation passed in 1882.

Alluri Seetarama Raju is considered to be South India 2nd Cinemascope after Raja Raja Cholan (Tamil)Telugu's first CinemaScope film. The film won the National Film Award for Best Lyrics for the song "Telugu Veera Levara" penned by the Telugu poet Sri Sri. The film won the Nandi Award for Best Feature Film, and was screened at the International Film Festival of India in the mainstream section, and Tashkent Film Festival. The film ran for 175 days and ended up becoming the highest-grossing Telugu film of the year.

Plot

Cast

Production 
D. L. Narayana, producer of Devadasu (1953), initially sought to make a film based on Alluri Sitarama Raju featuring Sobhan Babu as the title character. However, as the film failed to take off, Narayana had given the story to Krishna who was willing to produce it. Incidentally it was Tripuraneni Maharadhi who wrote the script for producer D.L. Narayana too. Tripuraneni Maharadhi wrote a Magnum opus of a script that revolutionised Telugu cinema industry.Filming took place around Chintapalle forest of Andhra Pradesh.

Soundtrack 
Soundtrack was composed by P. Adinarayana Rao.
"Viplavam Maraninchadu" – S. P. Balasubrahmanyam
"Jamaira Jaru" – S. P. Balasubrahmanyam, L. R. Eswari
"Vasthadu Naa Raju" – P. Suseela
"Padmalayam" – S. P. Balasubrahmanyam
"Telugu Veera" – Ghantasala, V. Ramakrishna

Reception

Critical reception 
The film received a positive review from Andhra Patrika dated 5 May 1974.

Box office 
The film ran for 200 days.

Awards 
National Film Awards
 National Film Award for Best Lyrics – Sri Sri for "Telugu Veera Levara"

Nandi Awards
 Best Feature Film - Gold - G. Hanumantha Rao

Legacy 
The film was screened at the Patriotic Film Festival held at Coimbatore in February 2017, jointly presented by the Indian Directorate of Film Festivals and Ministry of Defense, commemorating 70th Indian Independence Day.

See also
RRR (2022), a fictional film depicting Alluri Sitarama Raju and his contemporary Komaram Bheem

References

External links 
 

1970s Telugu-language films
Indian biographical films
Indian action films
Biographical action films
Indian historical action films
Films set in the Indian independence movement
Films set in the 1920s
British Empire war films
Films set in the British Raj
1974 films
1970s biographical films
1970s action films
Films about Alluri Sitarama Raju
Films directed by V. Ramachandra Rao